Monte Real is a town (vila in Portuguese) and a former civil parish in the municipality of Leiria, Portugal. In 2013, the parish merged into the new parish Monte Real e Carvide. It covers an area of 12.23 km² and has a population of 2,778 people. Monte Real, which in English means Royal Mount, was once a municipality (pt: concelho), before being annexed to Leiria municipality.

Monte Real hosts an air base (base aérea), Monte Real Air Base for the Portuguese Air Force.

Monte Real is also known for its hot springs, (Termas de Monte Real).

Climate

References

External links
Junta Freguesia

Parishes of Leiria
Former parishes of Portugal
Towns in Portugal